Atropos ("without turn") or Aisa, in Greek mythology, was one of the three Moirai, goddesses of fate and destiny. Her Roman equivalent was Morta.

Atropos was the oldest of the Three Fates, and was known as "the Inflexible One." It was Atropos who chose the manner of death and ended the life of mortals by cutting their threads. She worked along with her two sisters, Clotho, who spun the thread, and Lachesis, who measured the length. Atropos has been featured in several stories, such as those of Atalanta  and Achilles.

Origin
Her origin, along with the other two fates, is uncertain, although some called them the daughters of the night. It is clear, however, that at a certain period they ceased to be only concerned with death and also became those powers who decided what may happen to individuals. Although Zeus was the chief Greek god and their father, he was still subject to the decisions of the Fates, and thus the executor of destiny, rather than its source. According to Hesiod's Theogony, Atropos and her sisters (Clotho and Lachesis) were the daughters of Erebus (Darkness) and Nyx (Night) and sisters to Thanatos and Hypnos,  though later in the same work (ll. 901-906) they are said to have been of Zeus and Themis.

Dispute of origin 
In the ancient Greek poem, The Shield of Heracles, Atropos is referred to as the oldest and smallest of the three fates. This description is uncommon among references to Atropos. It is uncommon in ancient mentions of her in more ways than one as it turns out, including this fate's moniker. It's possible that Plato is behind the creation of Atropos as many of the early descriptions of the fates have Aisa as the name of this third fate, although there is still no clear consensus. The inconsistent nature of these accounts make it difficult to know for sure whether or not Aisa or Atropos is the best name to use when talking about the third fate, but evidence seems to point to Aisa being the more commonly used name earlier on, with Atropos gaining popularity later.

Zoology
The scientific name of a venomous snake, Bitis atropos, refers to Atropos.

The African Death's-head hawkmoth, Acherontia atropos, also has a species name which references Atropos.

References

External links
 
 
 
 

Moirai
Greek goddesses
Time and fate goddesses
Children of Zeus
Textiles in folklore
Greek death goddesses
Personifications in Greek mythology
Chthonic beings

id:Moirai#Atropos